David Webb is an American mathematician known for his work on hearing the shape of a drum.

Webb attended Cornell University, where he received his PhD in 1983 under the supervision of Kenneth Stephen Brown. He is currently a professor of mathematics at Dartmouth College in Hanover, New Hampshire.

In 2001 Webb and co-author Carolyn S. Gordon were awarded the Mathematical Association of America Chauvenet Prize for their 1996 American Scientist paper, "You can't hear the shape of a drum".

References

Year of birth missing (living people)
Living people
20th-century American mathematicians
21st-century American mathematicians
Cornell University alumni
Dartmouth College faculty
Place of birth missing (living people)